Mauricio Waldemar Muller (born 20 October 1981 in Doblas) is an Argentinian cyclist, who last rode for UCI Continental team .

In 2012, he participated in the road race at the 2012 UCI Road World Championships. In 2017, he won the Argentine National Time Trial Championships.

Major results
2016
 4th Overall Vuelta Ciclista del Uruguay
2017
 1st  Time trial, National Road Championships

References

External links

1981 births
Living people
Argentine male cyclists